This article lists events that occurred during 1931 in Estonia.

Events
Economic Depression in Estonia.

Births
1 April – Ita Ever, Estonian actress

Deaths

References

 
1930s in Estonia
Estonia
Estonia
Years of the 20th century in Estonia